John Reginald Cornes (30 October 1947 – 27 March 2014) was a rugby union player who represented Australia.

Cornes, a scrum-half, was born in Cambridge, New Zealand and claimed 1 international rugby cap for Australia.

References

Australian rugby union players
Australia international rugby union players
1947 births
2014 deaths
Sportspeople from Cambridge, New Zealand
People educated at Kuranui College
Rugby union scrum-halves
Rugby union players from Waikato